Cingulina circinata is a species of sea snail, a marine gastropod mollusk in the family Pyramidellidae, the pyrams and their allies.

Distribution
This marine species occurs off the coasts of Southeast Asia, waters surrounding Japan, mainly the Sea of Japan and Australian waters, such as the Bass Strait, Timor Sea and the Perth Basin.

References

External links
 World Register of Marine Species

Pyramidellidae
Gastropods described in 1860